Pourquoi Pas Island is a mountainous island,  long and from  wide, lying between Bigourdan Fjord and Bourgeois Fjord off the west coast of Graham Land. It was discovered by the French Antarctic Expedition under Charcot, 1908–10. The island was charted more accurately by the British Graham Land Expedition (BGLE) under John Rymill, 1934–37, who named it for Charcot's expedition ship, the Pourquoi-Pas ?.

See also 
 Black Pass
 Conseil Hill
 Composite Antarctic Gazetteer
 List of Antarctic and sub-Antarctic islands
 List of Antarctic islands south of 60° S
 Mount Arronax
 SCAR
 Territorial claims in Antarctica

References

External links

Islands of Graham Land
Fallières Coast